Kluki  is a village in Bełchatów County, Łódź Voivodeship, in central Poland. It is the seat of the gmina (administrative district) called Gmina Kluki.

The village has a population of 750.

References

Villages in Bełchatów County
Piotrków Governorate
Łódź Voivodeship (1919–1939)